Decacarbonyldihydridotriosmium is an organoosmium compound with the formula H2Os3(CO)10.  This purple-violet crystalline air-stable cluster is noteworthy because it is electron-deficient and hence adds a variety of substrates.

Structure and synthesis
The trinuclear cluster features an isosceles triangular array of metals with one short edge (rOs-Os = 2.68 Å), which is spanned by the two hydride ligands, and two longer edges (rOs-Os = 2.81 Å).  It can be described as Os(CO)4[Os(CO)3(μ-H)]2. The bonding in the Os2H2 subunit has been compared to the 3-center, 2e bonding in diborane. The molecule forms a variety of adducts with loss of H2.

It is prepared by purging a solution of Os3(CO)12 in octane (or other inert solvent of similar boiling point) with H2.
Os3(CO)12 + H2 → Os3H2(CO)10 + 2 CO

Reactions
The cluster reacts with a wide range of reagents under mild conditions.  Illustrative is its reaction with diazomethane to give Os3(CO)10(μ-H)(μ-CH3), exhibiting an agostic interaction, the first identified in a metal cluster.

References

Organoosmium compounds
Carbonyl complexes